Paul Norell (born 11 February 1952) is a British actor residing in Auckland, New Zealand. He is known for his portrayal as the King of the Dead in Peter Jackson's The Lord of the Rings: The Return of the King. Some of his other credits include Hercules: The Legendary Journeys playing the travelling food merchant Falafel and Power Rangers: SPD. He attended the RingCon 2004. Paul has two brothers in the UK: David who is a former actor/director and now manages Oakham School's Queen Elizabeth Theatre and teaches acting; and Michael, who is a Consultant Cardiologist in Wolverhampton.

Partial filmography
An Angel at My Table (1990) – Bohemian
Hercules: The Legendary Journeys (1995–1999) – Falafel
The Lord of the Rings: The Two Towers (2002) – Easterling (uncredited)
The Lord of the Rings: The Return of the King (2003) – King of the Dead
River Queen (2005) – Surgeon
Power Rangers: SPD (2005, TV Series) – Supreme Commander Fowler Birdie

External links
 

1952 births
Living people
English male film actors
English male television actors
Male actors from London
English expatriates in New Zealand